The Prodigal Son is a 1923 British silent historical film directed by A. E. Coleby and starring Stewart Rome, Henry Victor and Edith Bishop. The film is an adaptation of Hall Caine's 1904 novel The Prodigal Son, set in Iceland and the French Riviera. It was noted as a long film, reported variously at three or over four hours. The film's original release length as 18,454 feet made it the longest commercially made British film. It was shown in two consecutive parts, the second part being entitled The Return of the Prodigal.

It was shot on location in Iceland, with a final budget of £37,000. The film was not a commercial success on its release, and was attacked by critics. It was perhaps the biggest failure of all the films released by Stoll Pictures, the largest British film company of the early 1920s. However, the film was re-released in 1929 with a greatly reduced running time.

Plot
A marriage is arranged between Magnus Stephenson, son of the Governor of Iceland, and Thora Neilsen, daughter of "the Factor"; but the prospective bridegroom, discovering that Thora loves his brother, Oscar, a budding musician, blackens his own name at the betrothal ceremony by declaring the marriage contract not good enough. Outcast by his family for this apparent dishonour, Magnus paved the way for his younger brother Oscar to marry Thora. Troubles soon arise. Oscar becomes attracted to Helga, his wife's sister, who accompanies the newlywed couple on their honeymoon, and forges his father's signature for a large sum of money to pay his gambling debts at the Casino. Helga's announcement to her sister before the birth of Thora's baby, that Oscar does not love his wife, brings on an illness with homicidal tendencies. Against the wishes of Magnus, who tries prevent it, the baby, Elin, is taken away from the mother, who struggles leave the house to bring the child back and dies in the attempt. Oscar, overcome with remorse, places all his musical compositions on his wife's dead body to be buried with her.

Cast
 Stewart Rome as Magnus Stephenson  
 Henry Victor as Oscar Stephenson  
 Edith Bishop as Helga Neilson  
 Colette Brettel as Thora Neilson / Elin  
 Adeline Hayden Coffin as Anna Stephenson  
 Frank Wilson as Stephen Stephenson  
 Henry Nicholls-Bates as Oscar Neilson  
 Louise Conti as Aunt Margaret  
 Peter Upcher as Nils Finsen  
 Sam Austin as Captain

References

Bibliography
 Low, Rachael. History of the British Film, 1918-1929. George Allen & Unwin, 1971.
 Gifford, Denis. The British Film Catalogue: 1895-1970. McGraw-Hill, 1973.
 Oakley, Charles. Where We Came In: Seventy Years of the British Film Industry. Routledge, 2013.
 Robertson, Patrick. Movie Facts and Feats: A Guinness Record Book. Sterling Pub Co Inc, 1985, .

External links
 

1923 films
British historical drama films
British silent feature films
Films directed by A. E. Coleby
1920s historical drama films
Films set in Iceland
Stoll Pictures films
British black-and-white films
Films released in separate parts
1923 drama films
1920s English-language films
1920s British films
Silent historical drama films